Miwnay was a 4th-century Sogdian woman, who has been abandoned and left destitute in Dunhuang, China, by her husband Nanai-dhat. Miwnay is known from Sogdian Ancient Letters (I and III).

In the Ancient Letter No. 1, Miwnay writes to her mother, Chatis, and explains her and her child's (Shayn) situation and says she has tried to find someone to take her to her mother's house, but nobody is willing to help, so "I depend on charity from the Zoroastrian priest."

The Ancient Letter No. 3 is one of the letters of Miwnay to her husband, Nanai-dhat. She complains that her husband never answers her letters or sends money. "I obeyed your command and came to Dunhuang and did not observe my mother's bidding nor that of my brothers. Surely the gods were angry with me on the day when I did your bidding!". In the end of the letter, Miwnay says "I would rather be a dog's or a pig's wife than yours!"

References 

Sogdians
Sogdian people
4th-century Iranian people
4th century in China
Dunhuang
4th-century women